Mario Bruzzone (3 September 1897 – 25 September 1940) was an Italian sailor, who represented his country at the 1928 Summer Olympics in Amsterdam, Netherlands.

References

External links
 

19th-century births
1940 deaths
Italian male sailors (sport)
Sailors at the 1928 Summer Olympics – 8 Metre
Olympic sailors of Italy